The 1989 Greek Ice Hockey Championship season was the first season of the Greek Ice Hockey Championship. The Aris Saloniki Penguins won the inaugural title.

External links
List of champions on icehockey.gr

Greek Ice Hockey Championship seasons
Greek
1989 in Greek sport